Murtazali Gadjiev is a Russian-Dagestani archaeologist and scholar. He is the head of the archaeology department of Dagestan Scientific Center of Russian Academy of Science.

Gadjiev is specialised in the history of Derbent (Darband), Sasanian-era Persian presence in Caucasus and Culture of Caucasian Albania.

Life and work
Born in 1956 in Makhachkala, Republic of Dagestan and graduated from Daghestan State University (Makhachkala) and Institute of Archaeology, RAS, in Moscow. He has been a professor of 'Field Archaeology' at the Daghestan University in Makhachkala for around 10 years.

Murtazali Gadjjiev is a member of the Editorial board of the Journal of Caucasian Archeology, Tbilisi, and Deputy-Chairman of the Coordinating Committee of The International Conference on the North Caucasus Archaeology Krupnovskie chteniya.

References

External links
 Murtazali Gadjiev Academia Page (English & Russian)
 Middle Persian Inscriptions in Darband (Encyclopædia Iranica)

1956 births
Russian archaeologists
People from Dagestan
People from Makhachkala
Living people
Iranologists
Caucasologists